BMW has been producing engines for automobiles, motorcycles and aircraft since 1917, when the company began production of an inline-six aircraft engine. They have been producing automobile engines since 1933.

Motorcycle engines

Automotive petrol engines 
BMW is well known for its history of inline-six (straight-six) engines, a layout it continues to use to this day despite most other manufacturers switching to a V6 layout. The more common inline-four and V8 layouts are also produced by BMW, and at times the company has produced inline-three, V10 and V12 engines, BMW also engineered non-production customised engines especially for motorsports which include the M12/13 1.5-Liter straight 4 piston turbocharged engine from 1982-1987 for Brabham, Arrows and Benetton Formula One teams, the E41/P83 3.0-Liter V10 from 2000-2005 for Williams F1 Team and the P86/8  2.4-Liter V8 for their own F1 team partnering with Sauber F1 from 2006-2009, with which the company enjoyed its first and best finish at the 2008 Canadian Grand Prix as a full works F1 manufacturer team, finishing the race with their winning driver Robert Kubica, and Nick Heidfeld in second place.

British super car manufacturer McLaren Automotive, a manufacturer of road-going sports cars based on Formula One technology, decided to work with BMW for the development of their first ever production car—the McLaren F1 in 1993 for the engineering and customization of its engine—the S70, which had a 6.0-Liter 60° V12 DOHC configuration. As only 1,510 units of the cars were produced by McLaren, the S70 engine holds the record of the lowest production engines by BMW to date.

Prototype V16 engines have been made despite not reaching production. These prototypes were the 1987 BMW Goldfisch V16 6.7 litre engine and the 2004 Rolls-Royce 100EX 9.0 litre engine.
BMW has also made prototype V6 engines

Timelines

Automotive diesel engines 

* Also produced in a naturally aspirated configuration.

Timelines

Aircraft engines

Straight-six 
1917–1919 – IIIa, 19.1 L straight-six — first BMW corporate product of any kind
1919, 1925–? – IV, 23.5 L straight-six
1926–1927 - V, 22.9 L straight-six

V12 
VI, 38.2 L V12
1926–1937 – VI, 45.8 L V12
VIIa supercharged V12
116 (initially XII), projected 20.7 L V12, never manufactured
117 (initially XV), projected 36.0 L V12, never manufactured

Radial 
X, 2.2 L 5-cylinder
Xa, 2.9 L 5-cylinder
1933–? – 132, 27.7 L 9-cylinder, development of Pratt & Whitney R-1690 Hornet built under licence
1935 – 114, prototype diesel development of 132
1935 – BMW-Lanova 114 V-4, supercharged liquid-cooled diesel prototype development of 114
1939 - 139, prototype 18-cylinder double-row; two-row variant of 132
1939–1945 – 801, 41.8 L supercharged 14-cylinder double row
1942 – 802, projected 53.7 L supercharged 18-cylinder double row; 18-cylinder version of 801
803, projected 83.5 L supercharged 28-cylinder 4-row liquid-cooled; essentially two 801s coupled together
1936–1944 – Bramo 323, 26.8 L supercharged 9-cylinder, inherited when BMW bought Bramo in 1939

Jet 
1944–1945 – 003 axial flow turbojet
1997–2000 – BMW Rolls-Royce BR700 family of turbofans; Rolls-Royce plc bought out the venture in 2000.

References

BMW
BMW